Mary Elizabeth Taylor is an American political aide who served as the Assistant Secretary of State for Legislative Affairs from 2018 to 2020. She resigned on June 18, 2020 in protest of the handling of the George Floyd protests by President Donald Trump. She previously served in the Trump White House as the Deputy Director of Legislative Affairs of Nominations.

Early life and education 
Taylor is a native of Washington, D.C. She earned a degree in political science from Bryn Mawr College and interned at Koch Industries as a college student.

Career

Early political career 
Taylor began her career in Capitol Hill as an intern for the United States Senate in July 2006. She also worked in the Senate Republican cloakroom as a Senior Cloakroom Assistant. Taylor previously worked as an aide to Senate Majority Leader Mitch McConnell.

Trump administration 
Taylor served in the Trump White House as Special Assistant to the President for Legislative Affairs. In March 2017, she gained social media attention for her presence at the confirmation hearings of Neil Gorsuch as Associate Justice of the Supreme Court of the United States. Taylor worked on Gorsuch's nomination team when he met with U.S. senators before the confirmation hearings. In December 2018, Gorsuch officiated at Taylor's formal swearing-in ceremony at the U.S. Department of State.

In 2018, she was listed on the Forbes 30 under 30 list.

Department of State 
In 2018, Taylor was nominated to serve as Assistant Secretary of State for Legislative Affairs. Confirmed unanimously by the Senate in October 2018, Taylor became the first African-American woman and youngest to serve in this role, and the only African-American senior official in the State Department.

Trump-Ukraine Scandal 
In May 2019, members of Congress criticized President Trump's abrupt recall of Ambassador Marie Yovanovitch from her post in Ukraine after Trump surrogates claimed that Yovanovitch, a career diplomat, was impeding Trump's efforts to pressure the Ukrainian government to investigate his political rival Joe Biden. Yovanovitch testified she had originally been asked in March 2019 to extend her tour in Ukraine through 2020 before her sudden recall in May. But on June 11, 2019, Taylor misled federal lawmakers about the circumstances of Yovanovitch's recall, writing instead that Yovanovitch had been "due to complete her three-year diplomatic assignment in Kyiv this summer" and that the date she left her post "align[ed] with the presidential transition in Ukraine," despite the fact the State Department has no common practice of changing ambassadors based on transitions in foreign leadership. Taylor also failed to mention that Yovanovitch had been previously asked to extend her post in Ukraine.

Resignation 
On June 18, 2020, Taylor submitted her resignation from the State Department in response to President Donald Trump's handling of protests following the murder of George Floyd.

References

Date of birth missing (living people)
Living people
White House staff
African-American women in politics
United States presidential advisors
Bryn Mawr College alumni
Year of birth missing (living people)
21st-century African-American people
21st-century African-American women